Michael John Attwell (16 January 1943 – 18 March 2006) was an English film and television actor. He is possibly best known for his role as Kenny Beale in the television soap opera EastEnders.

After training at RADA (studying Stage Management), Attwell went into repertory theatre at Newcastle Playhouse. Among his theatrical appearances include playing Pharaoh in Joseph and the Amazing Technicolour Dreamcoat and Sky Masterson in Guys and Dolls (both at Haymarket Theatre).

In 1979 and 1980, he played Razor Eddie a.k.a. Edward Winston Malone in two series of the comedy-drama Turtle's Progress. The character had originally been created for the ITV drama serial The Hanged Man, where he was played by Gareth Hunt.

In 1978, he played Bill Sikes in the revival of Lionel Bart's musical Oliver! at the Albery Theatre and in 1985 he played Bill Sikes again in the BBC's Sunday afternoon classic serial Oliver Twist.

His other TV credits include: Doctor Who (in the serials The Ice Warriors and Attack of the Cybermen), The First Churchills, Only Fools and Horses, Minder, Bergerac, C.A.T.S. Eyes, Wycliffe, Inspector Morse, Bugs, Silent Witness,  Pie in the Sky, Casualty, The Bill, Hotel Babylon, and Are You Being Served?.

He appeared in the 1988 film Buster, based on the life of the Great Train Robber Buster Edwards.

To supplement his theatre income, Attwell produced cartoon strips for IPC and DC Thomson comics including Bunty, Buster, Whizzer and Chips and The Hotspur. As well as acting, between 1981 and 1993 Attwell also had a considerable career as a political cartoonist for several British national newspapers including The Sun, The Sunday People and the News of the World. A self-taught artist, Attwell signed himself as Zoke, an amalgam of the names of his children Zoe and Jake.

Death 
Attwell died in London on the 18 March 2006 aged 63 from complications following heart surgery. His life and work was honoured at the British Academy Television Awards in 2006.

Filmography

Film

Television

References

External links

Michael Attwell at Theatricalia

1943 births
2006 deaths
English male soap opera actors
People from Watford
Male actors from Hertfordshire
Alumni of RADA